Adamsville is an unincorporated community in Kent and Sussex counties of Delaware, United States. Adamsville is located at the intersection of Delaware Route 16 and Adamsville Road, northwest of Greenwood.

History

Adamsville's population was 20 in 1890, and was 28 in 1900.

References 

Unincorporated communities in Kent County, Delaware
Unincorporated communities in Sussex County, Delaware
Unincorporated communities in Delaware